The 1864 Waimea by-election was a by-election held on 29 November 1864 in the  electorate during the 3rd New Zealand Parliament.

The by-election was caused by the resignation of the incumbent MP Alfred Saunders on 31 October 1864.

The by-election was won by John George Miles.

Results

References

Waimea 1864
1864 elections in New Zealand
Politics of the Marlborough Region
1853 establishments in New Zealand
1887 disestablishments in New Zealand
Politics of the Nelson Region
November 1864 events